Éva Csulik (née Bozó, born April 5, 1954, in Békéscsaba) is a former Hungarian handball player and World Championship bronze medalist from 1975. She was also member of the Hungarian team which finished fourth on the 1980 Summer Olympics. She played in all five matches and scored eleven goals.

Awards
 Nemzeti Bajnokság I Top Scorer: 1976, 1978

References

External links
 Kígyósi Híradó 

1954 births
Living people
People from Békéscsaba
Hungarian female handball players
Olympic handball players of Hungary
Handball players at the 1980 Summer Olympics
Sportspeople from Békés County